This is a list of butterflies of Somaliland. About 131 species are known from Somaliland, five of which are endemic.

Papilionidae

Papilioninae

Papilionini
 Papilio nireus pseudonireus Felder & Felder, 1865
 Papilio dardanus byatti Poulton, 1926
 Papilio constantinus Ward, 1871
 Papilio microps Storace, 1952

Leptocercini
 Graphium colonna (Ward, 1873)

Pieridae

Coliadinae
 Eurema brigitta (Stoll, [1780])
 Eurema hecabe solifera (Butler, 1875)
 Colias electo pseudohecate Berger, 1940

Pierinae
 Colotis aurora evarne (Klug, 1829)
 Colotis celimene praeclarus (Butler, 1886)
 Colotis chrysonome (Klug, 1829)
 Colotis daira stygia (Felder & Felder, 1865)
 Colotis danae eupompe (Klug, 1829)
 Colotis danae pseudacaste (Butler, 1876)
 Colotis euippe complexivus (Butler, 1886)
 Colotis euippe exole (Reiche, 1850)
 Colotis evenina casta (Gerstaecker, 1871)
 Colotis fausta mijurteina Carpenter, 1951
 Colotis halimede restricta Talbot, 1939
 Colotis hetaera lorti (Sharpe, 1896)
 Colotis liagore (Klug, 1829)
 Colotis phisadia phisadia (Godart, 1819)
 Colotis phisadia somalica Storace, 1948
 Colotis pleione heliocaustus (Butler, 1886)
 Colotis protomedia (Klug, 1829) – yellow splendour tip
 Colotis regina (Trimen, 1863)
 Colotis venosa (Staudinger, 1885)
 Colotis vesta (Reiche, 1850)
 Colotis vestalis castalis (Staudinger, 1884)
 Colotis agoye zephyrus (Marshall, 1897)
 Pinacopterix eriphia melanarge (Butler, 1886)
 Nepheronia buquetii (Boisduval, 1836)
 Euchloe belemia abyssinica Riley, 1928
 Euchloe falloui (Allard, 1867)

Pierini
 Pontia distorta (Butler, 1886)
 Pontia glauconome Klug, 1829
 Mylothris agathina (Cramer, 1779)
 Belenois aurota (Fabricius, 1793)
 Belenois creona benadirensis (Storace, 1948)
 Belenois rubrosignata peeli Dixey, 1900
 Belenois thysa tricolor Talbot, 1943

Lycaenidae

Poritiinae

Liptenini
 Alaena johanna Sharpe, 1890
 Ornipholidotos peucetia peuceda (Grose-Smith, 1889)
 Baliochila fragilis Stempffer & Bennett, 1953

Aphnaeinae
 Chloroselas arabica (Riley, 1932)
 Chloroselas esmeralda Butler, 1886
 Chloroselas ogadenensis Jackson, 1966 (endemic)
 Cesa waggae (Sharpe, 1898) (endemic)
 Cigaritis acamas bellatrix (Butler, 1886)
 Cigaritis gilletti (Riley, 1925) (endemic)
 Cigaritis somalina (Butler, 1886)
 Axiocerses harpax kadugli Talbot, 1935
 Axiocerses jacksoni Stempffer, 1948
 Aphnaeus hutchinsonii Trimen & Bowker, 1887

Theclinae
 Hypolycaena liara Druce, 1890
 Leptomyrina gorgias sobrina Talbot, 1935
 Iolaus glaucus Butler, 1886
 Iolaus mimosae berbera (Bethune-Baker, 1924)
 Iolaus tajoraca Walker, 1870
 Iolaus umbrosa (Butler, 1886)
 Iolaus crawshayi maureli Dufrane, 1954
 Stugeta bowkeri albeza (Koçak, 1996)
 Stugeta somalina Stempffer, 1946
 Deudorix livia (Klug, 1834)

Polyommatinae

Lycaenesthini
 Anthene contrastata turkana Stempffer, 1936
 Anthene crawshayi minuta (Bethune-Baker, 1916)
 Anthene janna Gabriel, 1949
 Anthene opalina Stempffer, 1946
 Anthene otacilia dulcis (Pagenstecher, 1902)
 Anthene pitmani somalina Stempffer, 1936

Polyommatini
 Tuxentius cretosus lactinatus (Butler, 1886)
 Tarucus grammicus (Grose-Smith & Kirby, 1893)
 Tarucus kulala Evans, 1955
 Tarucus legrasi Stempffer, 1948
 Tarucus quadratus Ogilvie-Grant, 1899
 Tarucus rosacea (Austaut, 1885)
 Tarucus theophrastus (Fabricius, 1793)
 Azanus jesous (Guérin-Méneville, 1849)
 Euchrysops brunneus Bethune-Baker, 1923
 Euchrysops lois (Butler, 1886)
 Euchrysops migiurtiniensis Stempffer, 1946 (endemic)
 Euchrysops nilotica (Aurivillius, 1904)
 Chilades naidina (Butler, 1886)
 Lepidochrysops fumosa (Butler, 1886)
 Lepidochrysops polydialecta (Bethune-Baker, [1923])

Nymphalidae

Danainae

Danaini
 Danaus dorippus (Klug, 1845)
 Tirumala formosa neumanni (Rothschild, 1902)
 Amauris albimaculata hanningtoni Butler, 1888
 Amauris ochlea darius Rothschild & Jordan, 1903

Satyrinae

Satyrini
 Lasiommata maderakal (Guérin-Méneville, 1849)
 Bicyclus anynana (Butler, 1879)
 Ypthima jacksoni Kielland, 1982
 Ypthima simplicia Butler, 1876
 Neocoenyra duplex Butler, 1886
 Neocoenyra fulleborni Thurau, 1903
 Neocoenyra rufilineata Butler, 1894 (endemic)
 Physcaeneura leda (Gerstaecker, 1871)

Charaxinae

Charaxini
 Charaxes jasius Poulton, 1926
 Charaxes epijasius Reiche, 1850
 Charaxes jasius pagenstecheri Poulton, 1926
 Charaxes hansali Felder, 1867
 Charaxes etesipe patrizii Storace, 1949
 Charaxes zoolina (Westwood, [1850])

Nymphalinae

Nymphalini
 Junonia terea fumata (Rothschild & Jordan, 1903)
 Precis coelestina Dewitz, 1879
 Precis limnoria (Klug, 1845)
 Precis octavia (Cramer, 1777)
 Hypolimnas deceptor (Trimen, 1873)
 Hypolimnas misippus (Linnaeus, 1764)

Biblidinae

Biblidini
 Byblia anvatara acheloia (Wallengren, 1857)

Limenitinae

Adoliadini
 Bebearia orientis (Karsch, 1895)
 Euphaedra neophron ellenbecki Pagenstrecher, 1902

Heliconiinae

Acraeini
 Acraea anemosa Hewitson, 1865
 Acraea chilo Godman, 1880
 Acraea neobule Doubleday, 1847
 Acraea braesia Godman, 1885
 Acraea doubledayi Guérin-Méneville, 1849
 Acraea mirabilis Butler, 1886
 Acraea miranda Riley, 1920
 Acraea oncaea Hopffer, 1855
 Acraea serena (Fabricius, 1775)

Hesperiidae

Coeliadinae
 Coeliades anchises (Gerstaecker, 1871)
 Coeliades forestan (Stoll, [1782])
 Coeliades pisistratus (Fabricius, 1793)

Pyrginae

Celaenorrhinini
 Sarangesa phidyle (Walker, 1870)

Tagiadini
 Abantis meneliki Berger, 1979

Carcharodini
 Spialia colotes semiconfluens de Jong, 1978
 Spialia doris (Walker, 1870)
 Spialia mafa higginsi Evans, 1937
 Spialia mangana (Rebel, 1899)

Hesperiinae

Aeromachini
 Kedestes callicles (Hewitson, 1868)

Heteropterinae
 Metisella willemi (Wallengren, 1857)

See also
 List of moths of Somaliland
 Wildlife of Somaliland

References

 Mrs. E. Lort Phillips List of Lepidoptera collected in Somali‐land
 This butterfly was collected in Mandera, Somaliland, by Walter Feather in November 1908
 [https://pdfslide.net/documents/1-on-the-butterflies-obtained-in-arabia-aud-soinaliland-by-capt-chas-g.html CAPT. CHAS. G. NURSE AND COL. J. W. YERBURY IN 1894 AND 1895 ON THE BUTTERFLIES OBTAINED IN ARABIA AUD SOINALILAND]
 Seitz, A. Die Gross-Schmetterlinge der Erde 13: Die Afrikanischen Tagfalter. Plates
 Seitz, A. Die Gross-Schmetterlinge der Erde 13: Die Afrikanischen Tagfalter. Text 
 Butler,A.G., 1896, On the butterflies obtained in Arabia and Somaliland by Capt. Chas. G. Nurse and Col. J.W. Yerbury in 1894 and 1895. Proc. zool. Soc. Lond. 1896: 242-256, Pl.10.
 Holland,W.J., 1895, List of the Lepidoptera collected in Somaliland, East Africa, by Mr. William Astor Chanler and Lieut. von Hoehnel. Proc. U.S. nat. Mus. 18: 259-264.
 Pagenstecher,A., 1902, Wissenschaftliche Resultate der Reise des Freiherrn Carlo von Erlanger durch Süd-Schoa, die Galla und Somaliländer in 1900 und 1901. Tagfalter. Jb. nassau. Ver. Naturk. 55: 113-204, Taf.II.
 Pagenstecher,A., 1903, Wissenschaftliche Resultate der Reise des Freiherrn Carlo von Erlanger durch Süd-Schoa, die Galla und Somaliländer in 1900 und 1901. Sphingiden und Bombyciden. Jb. nassau. Ver. Naturk. 56: 3-28, Taf.I.

Somaliland
Somaliland
Afrotropical realm fauna
Butterflies
Insects of Somaliland